Six ships of the Royal Navy have been named HMS Jupiter, after the Roman god Jupiter.

  was a 50-gun fourth rate launched in 1778 and wrecked in 1808.
  was a 50-gun fourth rate launched in 1813. She was used as a troopship from 1837 and a coal hulk from 1846. She was broken up in 1870.
 HMS Jupiter was a coal hulk, originally launched in 1833 as the 44-gun fifth rate . She was renamed Jupiter in 1869 and was sold in 1883.
  was a  launched in 1895 and scrapped in 1920.
  was a J-class destroyer launched in 1938 and sunk by a mine in 1942.
  was a  launched in 1967 and sold for scrapping in 1997.

See also 
 

Royal Navy ship names